Peter Thomas Hollins (born 22 October 1947) is a British businessman, and a former chief executive of British Energy, which ran most of Britain's nuclear power stations, and was part of the FTSE 100 Index.

Early life
He was born in Hendon, Middlesex. He attended East Barnet Grammar School (became the comprehensive East Barnet School in 1971). He attended Hertford College, Oxford, from 1966 to 1970, gaining a degree in chemistry.

Career

British Oxygen
He joined BOC in 1970.

ICI
He joined ICI in 1973, working with ICI Chemicals and Polymers. In the late 1980s, he worked with halomethanes (these compounds destroyed the ozone layer), then moving in 1987 to ICI Soda Ash Products. From 1989 to 1992 he was General Manager of ICI Resins BV (ICI Holland at Waalwijk). He then worked for a joint venture of ICI and Enichem, of Italy, called European Vinyls Corporation (EVC Brussels), as Chief Operating Officer until 1998. The company was floated on the Amsterdam Stock Exchange in 1994. It was the world's biggest producer of PVC.

British Energy
He became chief executive of British Energy in 1998. Nuclear Electric had become British Energy in 1996. On 7 June 2001 he resigned as chief executive. From 2000 to 2001 he earned £330,000.

British Heart Foundation
He became director general of the British Heart Foundation (BHF) in 2003.

NHS
In April 2016 he became chairman of the University Hospital Southampton NHS Foundation Trust.

Personal life
He is fluent in Dutch, German and French. He married Linda Pitchford in 1973 in Barnet, they have two daughters (born 1977 and 1979), and live in Brockenhurst in south Hampshire. He has previously lived in Edinburgh.

See also
 Nuclear power in the United Kingdom

References

 Privatisation and Financial Collapse in the Nuclear Industry: The origins and causes of the British Energy crisis of 2002

External links
 Southampton NHS Trust
 University of Southampton
 Civil Society

1947 births
Alumni of Hertford College, Oxford
British chief executives in the energy industry
English chief executives
Imperial Chemical Industries people
National Health Service people
Nuclear power in the United Kingdom
People associated with nuclear power
People educated at East Barnet School
People from the London Borough of Barnet
People from Brockenhurst
Living people